Sanson was an Italian professional cycling team that existed for only the 1969 season. The team was one of several professional cycling teams throughout the 1960s and 1970s that were sponsored by Sanson Gelati, an Italian food producer.

Major wins
 Overall Tirreno–Adriatico, Carlo Chiappano
 Milano–Vignola, Attilio Rota
 Escalada a Montjuïc, Gianni Motta
 Giro dell'Emilia, Gianni Motta
 Stage 10 Giro d'Italia, Carlo Chiappano

References

External links

Cycling teams based in Italy
Defunct cycling teams based in Italy
1969 establishments in Italy
1969 disestablishments in Italy
Cycling teams established in 1969
Cycling teams disestablished in 1969